An anti-suicide smock, Ferguson, turtle suit, pickle suit, Bam Bam suit, or suicide gown, is a tear-resistant single-piece outer garment that is generally used to prevent a hospitalized, incarcerated, or otherwise detained individual from forming a noose with the garment to commit suicide. The smock is typically a simple, sturdily quilted, collarless, sleeveless gown with adjustable openings at the shoulders and down the front that are closed with nylon hook-and-loop or similar fasteners. The thickness of the garment makes it impossible to roll or fold the garment so it can't be used as a noose.  It is not a restraint and provides modesty and warmth while not impeding the mobility of the wearer. The suit covers all private areas as the wearer is to be naked under the suit for their own protection.

These items are formally known as Safety Smocks and were designed and developed by Lonna Speer in 1989 while she was a nurse working in the Santa Cruz, California, county jail.  Safety Smocks are now standard issue throughout jails and prisons in the United States. The same material is used for the anti-suicide blanket.  Prior to the use of the Safety Smock, many jails and prisons stripped inmates naked and held them in a stripped down-padded cell with no furniture or protrusions of any kind.  Some facilities opted to use paper gowns to provide modesty. The American Correctional Association (ACA) has established the use of appropriate Safety Smocks and Safety Blankets as one of the Standards used to judge jails and prisons for accreditation.  Demand for Safety Smocks to meet this ACA Standard led to multiple clothing makers creating similar garments of varying strength and of various materials. In addition to the Safety Smock, Lonna Speer developed the Safety Blanket and the Safe Sleeping Bag, all made from the quilted heavy nylon material, as well as The Dozer, a Suicide Cell mattress, the Safety Pillow, and Safety Slippers.

See also

 Suicide watch
 Guantanamo suicide attempts

References

Protective gear
Suicide prevention